Agreement for the New Greece is a social-democratic political party in Greece, established on 15 April 2013. It was formed by former Panhellenic Socialist Movement (PASOK) health minister Andreas Loverdos and former members of Radical Movement of Social Democratic Alliance (RIKSSY). It was also supported by Christos Aidonis, an independent MP (former member of PASOK) and Dimitris Tsironis (ex-MP for Arta). The party supports the idea of the Fourth Hellenic Republic.

The Agreement for the New Greece contested the 2014 European election as part of the PASOK-led Olive Tree electoral alliance.

On 22 August 2014, Loverdos returned to PASOK.

References

External links
 

Liberal parties in Greece
Social democratic parties in Greece
Political parties established in 2013
Pro-European political parties in Greece